Magnitogorsk International Airport  (also given as Magnitogorsk West) is an airport in Bashkortostan, Russia located 19 km west of Magnitogorsk, Chelyabinsk Oblast. It services medium-sized airliners. In 2017, 193,175 passengers passed through the Magnitogorsk airport.

Airlines and destinations

Accidents and incidents
 On 31 August 1972, an Ilyushin Il-18 operating Aeroflot Flight 558 crashed after failing to land due to an onboard fire.

References

External links
 Magnitogorsk Airport official website

Airports built in the Soviet Union
Airports in Bashkortostan
Airports in Chelyabinsk Oblast
Magnitogorsk